Eumolpopsis is a genus of leaf beetles in the subfamily Eumolpinae. It contains only one species, Eumolpopsis dimidiatus, found in Gabon, the Republic of the Congo, and the Democratic Republic of the Congo. The species was first described by Martin Jacoby in 1893, who named it Pseudeumolpus dimidiatus. However, Pseudeumolpus was found to be preoccupied, so the genus was renamed to Eumolpopsis by Jacoby in 1894.

References 

Eumolpinae
Monotypic Chrysomelidae genera
Beetles of Africa
Beetles of the Democratic Republic of the Congo
Taxa named by Martin Jacoby